Ezlopitant (INN, code name CJ-11,974) is an NK1 receptor antagonist. It has antiemetic and antinociceptive effects. Pfizer was developing ezlopitant for the treatment of irritable bowel syndrome but it appears to have been discontinued.

See also 
 NK1 receptor antagonist
 Maropitant (tert-butyl instead of isopropyl)

References 

Abandoned drugs
Amines
Antiemetics
NK1 receptor antagonists
Phenol ethers
Quinuclidines
Isopropyl compounds